Andere Leguina García (born 17 March 1989), occasionally referred to as Andere Legina, is a Spanish football goalkeeper who plays for Athletic Bilbao in Spain's Primera División as Ainhoa Tirapu's reserve.

She represented Spain in the 2007 Under-19 European Championship.

Career
She first joined Athletic Bilbao at the age of 14. In her two spells at Athletic Bilbao, she has predominantly been a backup goalkeeper to Ainhoa Tirapu. Following Tirapu's retirement in 2020, Leguina renewed her contract with Athletic Bilbao for a further year.

Personal life
Leguina is from Getxo. Outside of her football career, Leguina works as an engineer for IBM.

Honours

Club
 Athletic Bilbao
 Primera División (4): 2003–04, 2006–07

References

External links
 Profile at Athletic Bilbao 
 Profile at La Liga 
 

1989 births
Living people
Spanish women's footballers
Footballers from Getxo
Primera División (women) players
Athletic Club Femenino players
Women's association football goalkeepers